Bir Gandus or Bir Gandouz (Moroccan Arabic: بير گندوز, Berber: Bir Genduz) is a village in Western Sahara controlled by Morocco. As a rural commune of Morocco it serves as the headquarters of Morocco's Aousserd Province and recorded a population of 4625 in the 2014 Moroccan census. It holds a Moroccan military post. Although sometimes called so, it is not a border post. The border post to Mauritania is to the west on the RN1 at Guerguerat although the stamp given there bore the name of Bir Gandus.

References

External links
Satellite image on Google Maps

Provincial capitals in Morocco
Populated places in Aousserd Province
Populated places in Western Sahara
Mauritania–Western Sahara border